The Shire of Banana is a local government area located in the Capricorn region of Queensland, Australia, inland from the regional city of Gladstone. The shire was named after the first township in the region (Banana), which in turn was named for the burial site of a huge dun coloured bullock named 'Banana'.  The council sits in the town of Biloela, which is the largest town in the Shire.

Major industries in the shire include coal mining, beef production, power generation, dryland cropping and irrigation cropping such as lucerne and cotton.

History

Banana Division was created on 11 November 1879 as one of 74 divisions around Queensland under the Divisional Boards Act 1879 with a population of 2155.  The name Banana does not relate to the fruit, but rather the area was named after a dun-coloured bullock called Banana.

On 20 April 1881 part of Banana Division was separated to create Duaringa Division.

With the passage of the Local Authorities Act 1902, Banana Division became Shire on Banana on 31 March 1903.

The shire's administrative centre was in Banana until 1930, when the building was physically relocated to Rannes. In 1946, the shire headquarters moved to Biloela.

On 15 March 2008, under the Local Government (Reform Implementation) Act 2007 passed by the Parliament of Queensland on 10 August 2007, the Shire of Banana absorbed the northern part of the neighbouring Shire of Taroom, including the town of Taroom itself, while the southern part was amalgamated into the Dalby Region (later renamed to the Western Downs Region).

Offices

The council has 3 offices:
 Shire Chambers, 62 Valentine Plains Road, Biloela
 Administration Office, Gillespie Street, Moura
 Administration Office, Yaldwyn Street, Taroom

Towns and localities
The Shire of Banana includes the following settlements:

Banana area:
 Alberta
 Banana
 Baralaba
 Baroondah
 Biloela
 Broadmere
 Callide
 Camboon
 Castle Creek
 Cockatoo
 Coorada
 Cracow
 Dakenba
 Deeford
 Dixalea

 Dululu
 Dumgree
 Dumpy Creek
 Eurombah1
 Glebe
 Glenmoral
 Goovigen
 Hornet Bank
 Isla
 Jambin
 Kianga
 Kinnoul
 Kokotungo
 Lawgi Dawes
 Lonesome Creek
 Mount Murchison
 Moura

 Orange Creek
 Peek-a-doo
 Pheasant Creek
 Prospect
 Rannes
 Roundstone
 Spring Creek
 Tarramba
 Thangool
 Theodore
 Ulogie
 Valentine Plains
 Warnoah
 Westwood
 Woolein
 Wowan

North Taroom area:
 Ghinghinda
 Glenhaughton
 Gwambegwine
 Taroom

1 – shared with the Western Downs Region

Services and resources 
Banana Shire Council operate libraries at Biloela, Moura, Taroom, and Theodore. The council operates a fortnightly mobile library service to Banana (and Banana School), Baralaba, Goovigen (and Goovigen School), Jambin (and Jambin School), Mount Murchison School and Prospect Creek School.

It has an abundance of natural resources, especially undeveloped coal deposits present in the Theodore, Moura and Baralaba area. Being a large supplier of methane gas, Banana Shire provides this huge resource for power generation and industrial use. Liquified Natural Gas pipelines are being developed presently in the region, which has also become the largest commodity producer in the Fitzroy Statistical Area.

Chairmen and mayors 
The chairmen of the division and shire have been:
 1929–1930: Horace Moncreith Roxburgh
 1931:  Robert Staines
 2008–2012: John Hooper
 2012–2016: Ron Carige
 2016–present : Neville George Ferrier

Robert Staines 

Robert Staines was born on 25 June 1883 in Teven, New South Wales the son of Sarah Jane (née Crawford) and Joseph Staines. He attended Alstonville Public School commencing in 1888 and Newington College commencing in 1901. Staines married Daisy Emelie Gibb on 24 May 1911 at the bride's family home at John Street Stanmore, New South Wales. The union produced two daughters and a son.

At the 1926 Queensland state election, he was the Country and Progressive National Party candidate for the Electoral district of Mount Morgan. Following that he was a candidate  in the 1928, 1929 and 1931 federal elections unsuccessfully contesting the seat of Capricornia. In 1928 when Staines first ran for Capricornia against Frank Forde from the Labor Party, Country Party ministers in the Bruce conservative coalition government were said to be confident of his ability to win the seat. Whilst mentioning this in coverage of non-NSW seats the Sydney Morning Herald ultimately considered Forde to be the likely winner. At the time Forde was the only non-conservative Commonwealth Queensland member of the House of Representatives and so Staines campaign was closely monitored by the press.

He served as Chairman of the Shire of Banana in 1931. He was a member of the Rockhampton Harbour Board.

On 8 January 1937, Staines was killed in a motor vehicle accident near Goulburn, New South Wales, and was survived by his wife, two daughters, and a son. At the time of Staines death Frank Forde, Deputy Leader of the Federal Parliamentary Australian Labor Party and future Prime Minister of Australia, said of him: "although opposed to me politically, I learnt to respect him for his manly qualities and for his inherent sense of fair play. He did not at any time descend to personalities, nor did he take an unfair advantage of a political opponent. He gave able service in local authority affairs in Central Queensland for a number of years. His ability and enthusiasm merited further promotion in public life; and he would have been in the State Parliament as member for Fitzroy if he had accepted the invitation of his party to run for the seat in 1930."

References

Further reading

External links

 
 Banana Shire Tourism website

 
Banana
1879 establishments in Australia